Fisk Lake is a freshwater lake in East Grand Rapids, Michigan.  It was named for John Fisk.  Now primarily valued for scenic purposes, it was originally used as a source of ice for Grand Rapids, Michigan and the Chicago meatpacking industries.  It receives water from Reeds Lake, and drains to the Grand River by way of Coldbrook Creek.

See also
List of lakes in Michigan

References

 Webcam 

Lakes of Michigan
Lakes of Kent County, Michigan
East Grand Rapids, Michigan